Edward Załężny (born 20 December 1957) is a Polish footballer. He played in four matches for the Poland national football team in 1980.

References

External links
 

1957 births
Living people
Polish footballers
Poland international footballers
Place of birth missing (living people)
Association footballers not categorized by position